Priceless Wonder (游戏人生) is a Singaporean drama which aired on Channel 8. It debuted on 17 February 2010 with a run of 20 episodes.

Cast
Tiffany Leong as Xu Yuxuan 徐宇萱
Zen Chong as Li Caishun 李财顺 
Alan Tern as Xu Guoxing 徐国兴
Priscelia Chan as Lin Zhenni 林珍妮
Xiang Yun as Su Bizhu 苏碧珠
Nat Ho as Li Cailai 李财来
Jin Yinji as Chen Qiao E 陈巧娥
Yan Bingliang as Chen Youde 陈友德
Kanny Theng as Starley
Michelle Ng as Serene

Synopsis
Li Caishun is a bookie who followed in his father's footsteps. Despite this, he has a heart of gold and has been taking care of his mother Qiao E and brother Cailai ever since his father has been in and out of prison. He falls for Yuxuan, who works as a teller for a 4-D stand. Her widowed mother Bizhu gambled away their inheritance. Hence, Yuxuan detests all things related to gambling and jilts Caishun after finding out his real "occupation". Ironically, her older brother Guoxing is a CID officer who specialises in investigating gambling syndicates and often comes into conflict with his conscience after having to arrest his own mother on more than one occasion. Caishun decides to quit gambling for good but his resolve is tested when a tragedy hits his family and his and his father's past catches up with them.

Notes
This series is the second time Alan Tern and Priscelia Chan are playing on-screen husband and wife since their marriage in 2007.
This is the first time Zen Chong is playing a lead role.

References

External links
Priceless Wonder on MediaCorp

Singapore Chinese dramas
2010 Singaporean television series debuts
2010 Singaporean television series endings
Channel 8 (Singapore) original programming